Henry Archibald Williams (29 July 1898 – 8 April 1980) was an English professional footballer who played as an inside left in the Football League for Sunderland, Chesterfield, Manchester United and Brentford.

Career statistics

Honours 
Chesterfield
 Derbyshire Senior Cup: 1920–21

References 

1898 births
1980 deaths
People from Hucknall
Footballers from Nottinghamshire
English footballers
Association football inside forwards
Association football central defenders
Sunderland A.F.C. players
Chesterfield F.C. players
Manchester United F.C. players
Brentford F.C. players
English Football League players